"Roses" is a song by American DJ duo the Chainsmokers. It was released on June 16, 2015, as the second single from their debut EP, Bouquet (2015). The song features American singer Rozes. It was written by the Chainsmokers member Andrew Taggart and Rozes, and produced by the Chainsmokers.

Background
In an interview with Mike Wass of Idolator, the Chainsmokers said, "We always felt the song was special. When you want to listen to it again and again after you’ve made the song, you know you’ve got something. You’ve really got to put it out and let the public try to decide what it is and what it isn’t. When we put the song out, it was an overwhelmingly positive response. That doesn’t mean it’s a hit but we knew that it was a special song. I think that it definitely has a Chainsmokers feel to it, but there’s a lot of influences (Taylor Swift, Max Martin) in the production. But I think that’s what’s cool about it and why people are enjoying it because it doesn’t feel and sound like everything that’s on the radio right now. But it’s catchy and accessible. I think it’s refreshing."

Composition
"Roses" is written in the key of E major with a tempo of 100 beats per minute in common time. The song alternates between the chords E and E, and the vocals span from B3 to B4.

Music video
The music video for the song was released to YouTube on August 7, 2015. The video opens with a woman closing the shop she works in for the day, while a man is seen arriving on a plane and leaving the airport. They meet and spend the night watching an old film and smoking on her couch, however in the morning he leaves while she is still asleep. She is upset to see the man has gone and that night searches for him, while he is seen driving his car around the city. She is crying on a street when he sees her and stops his car, and they are reunited and embrace. They return to her couch and the video ends with them kissing. Throughout the video the woman can also be seen dancing in a dark, misty room with two spotlights, and after the couple are reunited, rose petals fall through the air as she dances through them.

Track listing

Charts

Weekly charts

Year-end charts

Decade-end charts

Certifications

See also
 List of best-selling singles in Australia

References

2015 songs
2015 singles
Columbia Records singles
The Chainsmokers songs
Songs written by Andrew Taggart
Disruptor Records singles
Songs about flowers